2004 BDO Curling Classic was held November 4–7, 2004 at the Glendale Golf & Country Club in Hamilton, Ontario. The total purse of the event was $100,000. It was the first of four (men's) Grand Slam events of the 2004-05 curling season, and it is considered to be that season's version of The National event. 

Edmonton's Kevin Martin rink overcame a 5–0 deficit to defeat Winnipeg's Jeff Stoughton team in the final, 10–9. Team Martin picked up $30,000 for the win.

Sportsnet covered the semifinal and final on television.

Teams
The teams were as follows:

Draw
The event was a triple knock out.

Playoffs
The playoff scores were as follows:

Final

References

External links

BDO Curling Classic, 2004
The National (curling)
2004 in Ontario
Sports competitions in Hamilton, Ontario
Curling in Ontario
November 2004 sports events in Canada